Squawk Box Europe (since May 2011, billed on-screen as just Squawk Box) is a television business news programme on CNBC Europe, aired from 7-10am CET (6-9am WET) each weekday. It also airs on CNBC Asia between 2.00 p.m.-5.00 p.m. Hong Kong / Singapore time (1.00 p.m.-4.00 p.m. with DST), and in the United States on CNBC World at the respective time, 1:00 a.m. - 4:00 a.m., ET. The programme is co-anchored by Geoff Cutmore, Steve Sedgwick and Karen Tso. Prior to June 2003, the programme ran for only two hours, between 7.00 and 9.00 UK time but later gained an hour from Today's Business.

History
Squawk Box Europe was in existence prior to CNBC Europe's merger with European Business News. Like the current version, the original version took viewers to the opening of the European markets. This version was hosted by Nigel Roberts. After the merger, it was replaced by Europe Today for more than a year before being revived in 1999. The programme was originally known by the fuller title of CNBC Europe Squawk Box until it was relaunched in September 2004 as part of a wider relaunch of all of CNBC Europe's programming. From this point it used titles and graphics inspired by (but unlike the previously set, not directly derived from) CNBC US' look at the time and the show's theme music was an edited version of its US' counterpart's theme music used between 2003-2005.

On 1 December 2008, Squawk Box Europe was relaunched with a new look, logo, and music. The programme became more similar to the US version but the new look was designed specially for Squawk Box Europe. Louisa Bojesen and Steve Sedgwick, previously reporters, were promoted to full co-presenters of the programme at this point, and the "News Update" segments, which had been axed by CNBC Europe some years previously, returned.

On 1 March 2010, Squawk Box Europe, along with the rest of CNBC Europe's programmes, realigned its graphics (and title) with those of CNBC U.S. Bojesen left the programme in April 2010 to join European Closing Bell, and was replaced by Anna Edwards, but she left the network at the end of 2011 and was subsequently replaced by Karen Tso (formerly of CNBC Asia).

On 9 May 2011, the programme's format received a major re-working, with the second hour of the programme being dubbed "Squawk Pre-Trade" and the third hour as "Squawk Real-Time". The programme's on air title was changed to simply "Squawk Box", in line with the US and Asian equivalents.

On 9 March 2015, Squawk Box Europe launched new titles and new theme music based on the US version.  On 27 April 2015, the Asia version began using the US theme music.

On 8 February 2016, both the Asian and European versions started using the remastered Squawk Box logo that has been used by their US counterpart since 4 January 2016.

Format
Since the May 2011 reformatting, the focus has been on the pan-European picture and the STOXX Europe 600 rather than on the national indices. It covers the opening of the European markets at 8:00 a.m. WET where Tso stands in front of the video wall.

A guest host also appears on the programme each day (during the second and third hour, like its US and Asian counterparts). Another important element of the show is its interviews with other analysts and CEOs of major companies. Viewers are welcomed to email their thoughts and questions to the show's guests.

Maria Bartiromo (who was part of the original US Squawk Box team) served as a guest co-anchor on the show when in London to co-host the annual European Business Leaders Awards until she left CNBC in November 2013.

Supplements to the show
The host of Squawk Box Europe, Geoff Cutmore, also has a blog on CNBC.com, called "Morning Thoughts".

See also
Asia Squawk Box
Squawk Box
Squawk Australia
 Wake Up to Money on BBC Radio 5 Live

References

External links
Squawk Box Europe official website

CNBC World original programming
CNBC Europe original programming
CNBC Asia original programming
British television news shows
1999 British television series debuts
2000s British television series
2010s British television series
2020s British television series
Business-related television series in the United Kingdom